Western Strikers are a soccer club from Adelaide, South Australia. Strikers play in the South Australian State League 2. Their home ground is at Carnegie Reserve.

History
The club was founded in 1980 under the name of VC Woodville City Junior Soccer Club.

Transition from State League to FFSA Super League
Western Strikers started in the State League in 2006, they made their way up to the Premier League in 2007–2008, and were promoted to the FFSA Super League for 2009 season. 
They are currently in South Australian State League 2.

Rivalry
Their main rivalry with White City FC

Current squad

References

National Premier Leagues clubs
Soccer clubs in South Australia
Association football clubs established in 1980
1980 establishments in Australia